Logan Pierce may refer to:

Logan Pierce (pornographic actor), mentioned in the Penny Pax article
Logan Pierce, character on List of Person of Interest characters